The 1926–27 season was Newport County's seventh season in the Football League, sixth season in the Third Division South and seventh season overall in the third tier.

Season review

Results summary

Results by round

Fixtures and results

Third Division South

FA Cup

Welsh Cup

League table

P = Matches played; W = Matches won; D = Matches drawn; L = Matches lost; F = Goals for; A = Goals against; GA = Goal average; Pts = Points

External links
 Newport County 1926-1927 : Results
 Newport County football club match record: 1927
 Welsh Cup 1926/27

1926-27
English football clubs 1926–27 season
1926–27 in Welsh football